Sanya Hongtangwan International Airport is an airport planned to be built to serve the city of Sanya in Hainan Province, China. Construction began in 2017, and the airport was expected to be opened in December 2020. However the same year, the project was suspended pending a new environmental assessment following complaints from Chinese environmental agency Friends of Nature. In 2020, part of the construction of the artificial island was deemed illegal, and further land reclamation was halted.

See also
List of airports in China
List of the busiest airports in China

References

Airports in Hainan
Proposed airports in China
Sanya
Artificial island airports
Artificial islands of China